Der Tod ist kein Beinbruch is a German television series.

See also
List of German television series

External links
 

2002 German television series debuts
2003 German television series endings
German comedy television series
Television shows set in North Rhine-Westphalia
German-language television shows
Das Erste original programming